Kat's Run: All Japan K-Car Championship is a racing video game, published by Atlus, which was released exclusively in Japan in 1995.  As the title implies, the playable vehicles are all kei cars.

There are two playable modes: Street race and V.S. race, which has four selectable courses. The player can choose ten different characters/drivers and ten vehicles, respectively.

Reception
On release, Famicom Tsūshin scored the game an 18 out of 40.

Notes

References

External links
 Kat's Run: Zen-Nippon K Car Senshuken at superfamicom.org
 KAT'S RUN 全日本Kカー選手権 at super-famicom.jp 

1995 video games
Atlus games
Japan-exclusive video games
Racing video games
Super Nintendo Entertainment System games
Super Nintendo Entertainment System-only games
Multiplayer and single-player video games
Video games developed in Japan